Willis Augusto Roberts (born June 19, 1975) is an American former pitcher in Major League Baseball, born in San Cristobal, Dominican Republic. He batted and threw right-handed.

Career
Roberts was signed by the Detroit Tigers as an amateur free agent in 1992. He remained with the Tigers organization from 1992 to 1999. He made it to the major leagues in 1999 and played for the Detroit Tigers, Cincinnati Reds, Baltimore Orioles and Pittsburgh Pirates until 2004.

Roberts made his major league debut on July 2, 1999, with the Detroit Tigers against the Minnesota Twins at Hubert H. Humphrey Metrodome with 12,033 people attending the game. Roberts relieved Will Brunson in the sixth inning, pitching one and one-third innings. The Tigers lost the game 11–4.

Roberts was released by the Tigers on February 1, 2000, and immediately joined the Cincinnati Reds as a free agent. Roberts was granted free agency on October 18 and signed with the Orioles on November 16. In the  baseball season, Roberts was most successful in limiting home runs, only allowing five home runs in 75 innings. His home run rate was roughly one home run allowed for every eighteen innings pitched, or 0.6 home runs per nine innings. Roberts played three seasons for the Orioles before being granted free agency on October 17, 2003. On January 20, 2004, Roberts signed with the Pittsburgh Pirates as a free agent. He played his final baseball game with the Pittsburgh Pirates on August 13, 2004, retiring just seven days later. The New York Mets brought Roberts in on a minor league deal prior to the 2005 season, but he did not play for them.

References

External links

Career statistics and player information from Baseball-Almanac
Information and statistics
Willis Roberts Pitching Log
Sports illustrated statistics
MLB players statistics
Baseball Library statistics
Baseball prospectsus statistics
Fangraphs statistics
Baseball chronology statistics

1975 births
Baltimore Orioles players
Cincinnati Reds players
Detroit Tigers players
Dominican Republic expatriate baseball players in Italy
Dominican Republic expatriate baseball players in the United States

Living people
Major League Baseball pitchers
Major League Baseball players from the Dominican Republic
Nashville Sounds players
Pittsburgh Pirates players
Rimini Baseball Club players
Azucareros del Este players
Bristol Tigers players
Chattanooga Lookouts players
Fayetteville Generals players
Jacksonville Suns players
Lakeland Tigers players
Louisville RiverBats players
Piratas de Campeche players
Dominican Republic expatriate baseball players in Mexico
Toledo Mud Hens players